Vera Schenone (born 25 April 1940) is an Italian former alpine skier. She competed in three events at the 1956 Winter Olympics.

References

External links
 

1940 births
Living people
Italian female alpine skiers
Olympic alpine skiers of Italy
Alpine skiers at the 1956 Winter Olympics
Sportspeople from the Metropolitan City of Turin